The North Side School in Bonners Ferry, Idaho was built in 1914.  It was listed on the National Register of Historic Places in 1992.

It was designed by Keith & Whitehouse and it was built by J.G. Cox.  It replaced a two-room schoolhouse and was used as a school from 1914 until 1990.  The building then was purchased by Jim and Ruth Burkholder who planned to renovate it to serve as their home.

References

School buildings on the National Register of Historic Places in Idaho
Neoclassical architecture in Idaho
School buildings completed in 1914
Buildings and structures in Boundary County, Idaho
Schools in Idaho
1914 establishments in Idaho